{{Infobox CBB Team
|current = 2022–23 Milwaukee Panthers men's basketball team
|name = Milwaukee Panthers men's basketball
|logo = Wisconsin-Milwaukee Panthers wordmark.svg
|logo_size = 250
|university = University of Wisconsin–Milwaukee
|conference = Horizon League
|location = Milwaukee, Wisconsin
|coach = Bart Lundy
|tenure = 
|arena = UWM Panther Arena
|capacity = 10,783
|student section = 
|nickname = Panthers
|h_body= FFBD00
|h_pattern_b=_thinsidesonwhite
|h_shorts= FFBD00
|h_pattern_s=_blanksides2
|a_body=000000
|a_pattern_b=_thingoldsides
|a_shorts=000000
|a_pattern_s=_thingoldsides
|NCAAchampion =
|NCAAfinalfour =
|NCAAeliteeight =
|NCAAsweetsixteen = 2005
|NCAAroundof32         =  2005, 2006
|NCAAtourneys =2003, 2005, 2006, 2014
|conference_tournament = Horizon League2003, 2005, 2006, 2014
|conference_season =WIAC 1913, 1934, 1940, 1941, 1943, 1948, 1960

Horizon League2004, 2005, 2006, 2011 ''
}}

The Milwaukee Panthers men's basketball team is an NCAA Division I college basketball team competing in the Horizon League for the University of Wisconsin–Milwaukee. They play their home games at UW–Milwaukee Panther Arena in Milwaukee, Wisconsin, and are currently coached by Bart Lundy.

History
UWM's predecessor institutions (Milwaukee Normal School, Milwaukee State Teachers College and Milwaukee State College) have competed in basketball since the 19th century as the Milwaukee Normals (1896–1927) and Milwaukee State Green Gulls''' (1927–1956).

Milwaukee State's only undefeated season came in 1940 under head coach Guy Penwell as the Green Gulls finished the year 16–0 enroute to their third Wisconsin State Conference championship.

The team competed under the University of Wisconsin-Milwaukee name for the first time for the 1956–57 season.  In honor of joining the University of Wisconsin System, they sported the cardinal red and white colors and adopted "Cardinals" as their nickname.  Three years later, the Cardinals made their first post-season appearance in the 1960 NCAA Men's Division II Basketball Tournament.

1965–1998: Becoming the Panthers; up to Division I
Seeking to establish their own identity, Milwaukee adopted the colors of black and gold on September 1, 1965 and became known as the Panthers. They also left the Wisconsin State College Conference (now the Wisconsin Intercollegiate Athletic Conference), of which they had been members since 1913, to form a conference with other urban public universities in the Great Lakes region such as Illinois-Chicago and Cleveland State.  Such plans for a new conference never materialized, and the Panthers remained independent even as they moved from the NCAA College Division (now NCAA Division II) to the University Division (now NCAA Division I) in 1973.

The team moved again to NCAA Division III in 1980. Between 1985 and 1987, Milwaukee competed in the National Association of Intercollegiate Athletics. In 1987, the program moved to NCAA Division II where it won its regional in the 1989 NCAA Division II men's basketball tournament, advancing to the contest's Elite Eight. Since 1990, Milwaukee Men's Basketball has competed in NCAA Division I. They played in the Mid-Continent Conference for one year in 1993–94 before joining the Midwestern Collegiate Conference, which became the Horizon League in 1999 and has been the Panthers' home ever since.

1999–2001: Bo Ryan era
In 1999, the Panthers hired Bo Ryan, a highly successful Division III coach at UW–Plattville, as the team's new head coach. Under Ryan, the Panthers had their first consecutive winning seasons since 1993, and Ryan was also instrumental in bringing wider attention and fan enthusiasm to the program. After just two seasons, Ryan left to become the head coach of the Wisconsin Badgers basketball team.

2002–2005: Bruce Pearl era
After Bo Ryan's departure, Milwaukee would hire Bruce Pearl, a successful Division II coach at Southern Indiana, as head coach. Milwaukee reached new heights of success during the mid-2000s, making its first NCAA Men's Division I Basketball Championship appearance in 2003 under Pearl, followed by a Sweet Sixteen appearance in 2005 and a second-round appearance in 2006. Pearl left to become the head coach at Tennessee after 2005 and the school hired Rob Jeter, a former assistant under Bo Ryan. The Panthers won three straight regular-season Horizon League championships from 2004 to 2006 as well as the Horizon League tournament championship in 2003, 2005, and 2006.

2006–2015: Rob Jeter era
The Panthers' most recent Horizon League regular season championship came in 2011. In 2014, the Panthers won the Horizon League tournament, making their first NCAA tournament appearance since 2006. Just a few weeks later, UWM was handed a one-year postseason ban due to a low Academic Progress Rate. Under Jeter, while the Panthers were mostly competitive, they were unable to stay consistently on top in the Horizon League.

On March 17, 2016, Milwaukee fired Rob Jeter after 11 seasons with the Panthers.

2016–2021: Program on the decline
On April 7, Milwaukee announced that Michigan assistant coach LaVall Jordan would be the new head coach.

Less than one year later, on March 3, 2017, the Panthers made history by being the first No. 10 seed to win a game in the Horizon League Tournament. They went on to place second overall in the tournament, losing to Northern Kentucky in the championship game on March 7. After this one lone season, Jordan accepted the head coaching job at Butler.

In 2021, the Panthers made national news when they were able to successfully recruit Patrick Baldwin Jr, who was rated by ESPN as the #5 top basketball prospect in the country. Baldwin struggled with injury in his freshman season, and the Panthers finished the season a dismal 10-22. Even so, Baldwin was selected 28th by the Golden State Warriors in the 2022 NBA Draft, becoming the first player in the program to be a first-round draft pick. Coach Pat Baldwin Sr. was fired at the end of the season.

2022–Present: Bart Lundy era
On March 18, 2022, the Panthers hired Bart Lundy, a successful Division II coach at Queens (NC), as the team's next head coach. In Lundy's first season as head coach, the Panthers won 20 regular season games for the first time since 2004-05, finishing 2nd in the Horizon League, though the young team would lose in the semifinals of the conference tournament to Cleveland State.

Coaching records

Milwaukee wins vs. the AP Top 25

Postseason

NCAA Division I Tournament results
The Panthers have appeared in the NCAA Division I tournament four times. Their combined record is 3–4.

NCAA Division II Tournament results
The Panthers have appeared in the NCAA Division II tournament two times. Their combined record is 3–2.

NCAA Division III Tournament results
The Panthers have appeared in the NCAA Division III tournament one time. Their record is 1–1.

NIT results
The Panthers have appeared in the National Invitation Tournament (NIT) two times. Their combined record is 1–2.

CBI results
The Panthers have appeared in the College Basketball Invitational (CBI) one time. Their record is 0–1.

Conferences

Home arenas

Milwaukee—Green Bay rivalry records

Players in the NBA draft

See also
WISN (AM)
Season by Season results

References
Basketball Media Guide (history)

External links